Dorothy Seastrom (born Dorothy Susan Seastrunk Corby; March 17, 1903 – January 31, 1930) was an American silent film actress.

Early life and career
Born in Texas, Seastrom got into acting after winning a beauty competition. Her family later relocated to Chicago. Her film career began in 1923 with the role of Eleanor Harmon in The Call of the Canyon, directed by Victor Fleming. Later she acted under the direction of Cecil B. Demille. She signed a five-year contract with First National Pictures in September 1925. Seastrom was called the "Candy Kid" at First National due to her taffy colored hair. 

She appeared in The Perfect Flapper with Colleen Moore and Classified with Corinne Griffith. Seastrom barely avoided a potentially disfiguring accident during the filming of We Moderns (1925). A shower of sparks from a short-circuited light fell upon her hair and shoulders at the United Studios. Seastrom escaped injury when assistant director James Dunne grabbed a tablecloth from a prop table and covered the actress's head. Electricians shut off the power to a light which hung from the fly system above the scene. Seastrom made a full recovery from the burns she sustained. She returned to complete the film. 

In 1926, Seastrom missed six months from acting while she had to rest in a sanitarium and "build up a physique weakened by work and worry".

Death
After being in a sanatorium, in 1926, Seastrom returned and appeared in her final film It Must Be Love. (The widower Corby wed a young script girl turned actress named Ellen Hansen in 1934; they divorced in 1944.) Seastrom died of tuberculosis in Dallas on January 31, 1930, aged 26. She was buried in Grove Hill Memorial Park in Dallas, Texas.

Filmography

References

Charleston Gazette, "Dorothy Seastrom On For Long Term", September 27, 1925, Page 35.
Frederick Daily News, "She Just Worships Vikings", Tuesday, March 24, 1925, Page 11.
Los Angeles Times, "Beauty Periled By Shower of Sparks", August 18, 1925, Page A1.
Los Angeles Times, "Actress Burned In Film Set Recovers", August 24, 1925, Page A3.
Los Angeles Times, "Dorothy Seastrom Will Be With First National", September 9, 1925, Page A9.
Los Angeles Times, "Avoirdupois is Banned on First National Lot", September 16, 1925, Page 6.
Los Angeles Times, "Illness Halts Film Rise", September 28, 1925, Page A10.
Nevada State Journal, "Behind The Screen", Sunday, May 2, 1926, Page 6.

External links

 

20th-century American actresses
Actresses from Texas
American film actresses
American silent film actresses
20th-century deaths from tuberculosis
Tuberculosis deaths in Texas
People from Dallas
Western (genre) film actresses
1903 births
1930 deaths